Sarrasin is a surname.  Notable people with the surname include:

 Grégory Sarrasin (born 1979), Swiss sport wrestler
 Maeva Sarrasin (born 1987), Swiss women's footballer

See also 
 Saracen (disambiguation)
 Sarrazin